Joe Beats (born Joe DelCarpini, October 4, 1977) is an American hip hop producer from Rhode Island. He is best known as the co-producer for the duo Non-Prophets.

DelCarpini was born in Warwick, Rhode Island.

Collaborative efforts

Non-Prophets
Non-Prophets is a pairing of lyricist Sage Francis and beatmaker Beats. The duo came to attention with their first single, the "Drop Bass" b/w "Bounce" on Emerge Music in 1999. The follow-up release in 2000 was the "All Word, No Play" vinyl single. Francis’ self-released "Sick Of" series also included some Non-Prophets material.

Their first album, Hope was released on Lex Records in October 2003. The album was praised almost unanimously by critics. It received a rating of 9.2 out of a possible 10 on Pitchfork Media. Hope was also nominated by Neil Strauss for the Shortlist Music Prize of 2004.

In early 2004, they toured the United States on the infamous 40-city Fuck Clear Channel tour.

Joe Beats & Blak
Joe Beats & Blak came together during significant pauses in both of their former groups (Non-Prophets and One Drop).

Despite living over 1200 miles apart in Rhode Island and Florida, the new duo have already embarked on two tours, releasing an EP in the process. Joe Beats & Blak are now in the process of creating their first LP.

Solo career
Most of Beat’s solo efforts are presented in a continuous mix; one track transitions into the next without any pauses. With the exception of Indie Rock Blues, a mix using indie rock tracks, Beats’ projects usually contain raw hip hop instrumentals originally intended for MCs to rap over. A vocal version of Diverse Recourse'''s "Friday Afternoon" is featured on Ambidex's The Great Potato Famine.

Discography

with Non-Prophetssee Non-Prophets#Discography

Solo

Albums

12” singles

7” singles

References

External links
Joe Beats on Bandcamp

1977 births
Living people
American hip hop record producers
Musicians from Providence, Rhode Island
Businesspeople from Providence, Rhode Island
People from Warwick, Rhode Island